Porto de Moz is a municipality in the state of Pará in the Northern region of Brazil.

The municipality contains the  Verde para Sempre Extractive Reserve, a sustainable use conservation unit created in 2004.

The city is served by Porto de Moz Airport.

Climate
The climate is tropical monsoon (Köppen: Am), with great differences in precipitation according to the seasons.

See also
List of municipalities in Pará

References

Municipalities in Pará